Plaza de Cuba is a station of the Seville Metro on the line 1. It is located at the intersection of the avenue of República Argentina and Asunción St., in the neighborhood of Los Remedios. Plaza de Cuba is an underground station, located between Parque de los Príncipes and Puerta Jerez stations on the same line. It was opened on 2 April 2009.

Connections
Bus: 5, 40, 41, C3, M-140, M-150, M-151, M-152, M-153, M-240

See also
 List of Seville metro stations

References

External links 
  Official site.
 History, construction details and maps.

Seville Metro stations
Railway stations in Spain opened in 2009